John Alfred Mandel (November 23, 1925June 29, 2020) was an American composer and arranger of popular songs, film music and jazz. The musicians he worked with include Count Basie, Frank Sinatra, Peggy Lee, Anita O'Day, Barbra Streisand, Tony Bennett, Diane Schuur and Shirley Horn. He won five Grammy Awards - from 17 nominations; his first nomination was for his debut film score for the multi-nominated 1958 film I Want to Live!

Early life
Mandel was born in the borough of Manhattan in New York City on November 23, 1925. His father, Alfred, was a garment manufacturer who ran Mandel & Cash; his mother, Hannah (Hart-Rubin), had aimed to be an opera singer and discovered her son had perfect pitch at the age of five. His family was Jewish. They moved to Los Angeles in 1934, after his father's business collapsed during the Great Depression. Mandel was given piano lessons, but switched to the trumpet and later the trombone.

Career
Mandel studied at the Manhattan School of Music and the Juilliard School. In 1943, he played the trumpet with jazz violinist Joe Venuti. The following year, he worked with Billy Rogers and played trombone in the bands of Boyd Raeburn, Jimmy Dorsey, Buddy Rich, Georgie Auld and Chubby Jackson. In 1949 he accompanied the singer June Christy in the orchestra of Bob Cooper. From 1951 until 1953 he played and arranged music in Elliot Lawrence's orchestra, and in 1953 with Count Basie. He subsequently resided in Los Angeles, where he played the bass trumpet for Zoot Sims.

A 1944 Band graduate of New York Military Academy, in Cornwall-on-Hudson, New York, he wrote jazz compositions including "Not Really the Blues" for Woody Herman in 1949, "Hershey Bar" (1950) and "Pot Luck" (1953) for Stan Getz, "Straight Life" (1953) and "Low Life" (1956) for Count Basie, as well as "Tommyhawk" (1954) for Chet Baker.

Mandel composed, conducted and arranged the music for numerous movie sound tracks. His earliest credited contribution was to I Want to Live! in 1958, which was nominated for three Grammy Awards. His other compositions include "Suicide Is Painless" (theme song for the movie and TV series M*A*S*H), "Close Enough for Love", "Emily" and "A Time for Love" (nominated for an Academy Award). "Emily" was a favorite of pianist Bill Evans and alto saxophonist Paul Desmond, both of whom included it in live performances until they died, and Evans included it in a duo recording with Tony Bennett. Mandel wrote numerous film scores, including the score of The Sandpiper. The love theme for that film, "The Shadow of Your Smile", which he co-wrote with Paul Francis Webster, won the 1965 Academy Award for Best Original Song and the Grammy Award for Song of the Year in 1966.

Mandel performed an interpretation of Erik Satie's "Gnossiennes #4 and #5" on the piano for the film Being There (1979).

He won the Grammy Award for Best Instrumental Arrangement Accompanying Vocal(s) in 1981 for Quincy Jones's song Velas, and again in 1991 for Natalie Cole and Nat King Cole's "Unforgettable", and one year later once more for Shirley Horn's album Here's to Life.

In 2004, Mandel arranged Tony Bennett's album The Art of Romance. Bennett and Mandel had collaborated before on Bennett's The Movie Song Album (1966), for which Mandel arranged and conducted his songs "Emily" and "The Shadow of Your Smile", and was also the album's musical director.

Johnny Mandel, A Man and His Music, featuring The DIVA Jazz Orchestra and vocalist Ann Hampton Callaway was recorded live at Jazz at Lincoln Center's Dizzy's Club Coca-Cola in May 2010, and released by Arbors Records in March 2011.

In 2012, he worked on one of Paul McCartney's most recent songs at the time "My Valentine". He provided the song with a new and original arrangement. It appeared on McCartney's expanded version of his album Kisses on the Bottom in November of that year.

Personal life and honors
Mandel married Lois Lee in 1959, and Martha Blanner in 1972, and had a daughter, Marissa, born in 1976. Mandel was also the cousin of fellow film composer, Miles Goodman.

Mandel was awarded an honorary doctorate from Berklee College of Music in 1993. He was inducted to the Songwriters Hall of Fame in 2010. He was a recipient of the 2011 NEA Jazz Masters Award. He subsequently received The Grammy Trustees Award in 2018, which is awarded by The Recording Academy to "individuals who, during their careers in music, have made significant contributions, other than performance, to the field of recording".

Mandel died on June 29, 2020, at his home in Ojai, California. He was 94, and suffered from a heart ailment.

Selected works

Compositions

 "A Christmas Love Song" (lyrics by Alan Bergman & Marilyn Bergman)
 "Close Enough for Love" (lyrics by Paul Williams)
 "Emily" (lyrics by Johnny Mercer)
 "Little Did I Dream" (lyrics by David Frishberg)
 "The Shadow of Your Smile" (lyrics by Paul Francis Webster)
 "Suicide Is Painless" (lyrics by Mike Altman)
 "Summer Wishes, Winter Dreams" (lyrics by Alan Bergman & Marilyn Bergman)
 "A Time for Love" (lyrics by Paul Francis Webster)
 "Where Do You Start?" (lyrics by Alan Bergman & Marilyn Bergman)
 "You Are There" (lyrics by Dave Frishberg)
 "The Moon Song" (aka "Solitary Moon")

Arrangements

 1956: Hoagy Sings Carmichael by Hoagy Carmichael
 1960  Jo + Jazz by Jo Stafford
 1960: Ring-a-Ding-Ding! by Frank Sinatra
 1962: I Dig the Duke! I Dig the Count! by Mel Tormé
 1966: "Emily" and "The Shadow of Your Smile" from The Movie Song Album by Tony Bennett
 1975: "Mirrors" by Peggy Lee
 1979: "Coolsville" and "Company" from Rickie Lee Jones by Rickie Lee Jones
 1981: "Velas" from The Dude by Quincy Jones 1991: "Mona Lisa", "Smile", "Lush Life", "That Sunday That Summer", "Too Young", "Our Love is Here to Stay", "Unforgettable" from Unforgettable... with Love by Natalie Cole
 1992: Here's to Life by Shirley Horn
 1992: "God Bless the Child" and "Body and Soul" from In Tribute by Diane Schuur
 1992: The Christmas Album by Manhattan Transfer
 1993: "Will You Be There" by Michael Jackson
 1995: Pearls by David Sanborn
 1999: When I Look in Your Eyes by Diana Krall
 2001: You're My Thrill by Shirley Horn
 2003: "Summer Wind" ,"That's All (1952 song)" by Michael Buble
 2004: The Art of Romance by Tony Bennett
 2009: Love Is the Answer by Barbra Streisand

Filmography
Johnny Mandel composed and/or arranged music for the following motion pictures or television programs:

 1958:  I Want to Live! 1960:  The 3rd Voice 1961:  The Lawbreakers 1963:  Drums of Africa 1964:  The Americanization of Emily 1965:  The Sandpiper 1965:  Mister Roberts (TV series; 1 episode)
 1966:  Harper 1966:  The Russians Are Coming, the Russians Are Coming 1966:  Bob Hope Presents the Chrysler Theatre (TV series; 2 episodes)
 1967:  Point Blank 1968:  Pretty Poison 1969:  Heaven with a Gun 1969:  That Cold Day in the Park 1969:  Some Kind of a Nut 1970:  M*A*S*H 1970:  The Man Who Had Power Over Women 1972:  M*A*S*H (TV series)
 1972:  Journey Through Rosebud 1972:  Molly and Lawless John 1973:  The Last Detail 1973:  Summer Wishes, Winter Dreams 1974:  W 1975:  Escape to Witch Mountain 1976:  Freaky Friday 1976:  The Sailor Who Fell from Grace with the Sea 1979:  Agatha 1979:  Being There 1979:  The Baltimore Bullet 1980:  Too Close for Comfort (TV series; 2 episodes)
 1980:  Caddyshack 1982:  Deathtrap 1982:  Lookin' to Get Out 1982:  The Verdict 1986:  Amazing Stories (TV series; 1 episode)
 1989:  Brenda StarrDiscography

 1953: Dance Session with Count Basie (Clef)
 1966: Quietly There, Bill Perkins Quintet (Riverside)
 1958: A Sure Thing: David Allen Sings Jerome Kern (Pacific Jazz)
 2011: Johnny Mandel, A Man and His Music'', with The DIVA Jazz Orchestra and Ann Hampton Callaway (Arbors)

See also 
 List of jazz arrangers
 List of music arrangers

References

External links
 
 
 
 
 Interview with Marc Myers at JazzWax
 Alumni of Distinction at New York Military Academy archives page
 NAMM Oral History Interview August 26, 2009

1925 births
2020 deaths
20th-century American composers
20th-century American Jews
20th-century American male musicians
21st-century American composers
21st-century American Jews
21st-century American male musicians
Best Original Song Academy Award-winning songwriters
American film score composers
American male film score composers
American male songwriters
American music arrangers
American television composers
Grammy Award winners
Jewish American film score composers
Jewish American songwriters
Jewish American television composers
Male television composers
New York Military Academy alumni
Songwriters from New York (state)